Ankit Singh Patyal, better known by his stage names Ikka and Ikka Singh (formerly Young Amli), is an Indian rapper and lyricist. He debuted in Bollywood with the song "In Da Club" for the 2014 film Tamanchey.

Career

Ikka Singh aka Ankit. He is well known for hip hop rap songs. Ikka Singh worked a lot for his musical passion and that's how he became inspiration for millions. The Punjabi origin rapper Ikka Singh gave a really lit tastes of pop to the Hip Hop lovers, by his incredible talent. 

Ikka Singh worked a long with top famous stars of Indian Music Industry. From Honey Singh to Badshah everyone appreciates his talent and Hardships to be a true gem of Indie Pop World.

Ikka Singh made his debut song in 2015. The song "Pani Wala Dance" in which Sunny Leone was featured, was one of the famous song till now. Ikka generally known for his one of earlier songs like "In Da Club" which was way more game changing song for the music artist.

Discography

Bollywood music

Albums and EPs

Singles, collaborations and features

References

External links
 Ikka Singh: Rappers write what youngsters talk at RadioandMusic.com Ikka Singh

Living people
Indian rappers
Indian record producers
Musicians from Delhi
Year of birth missing (living people)